is the 8th single from Ayaka. It was released on March 5, 2008.

Overview
Te o Tsunagō was used as a theme song for the film Doraemon: Nobita and the Green Giant Legend. Since December 2007, Ai o Utaō is used for commercials for BEAUTÉ de KOSÉ's "ESPRIQUE PRECIOUS".

Track

2008 singles
Ayaka songs
Doraemon mass media
2008 songs
Warner Music Japan singles
Songs written by Ayaka
Anime songs